Deimantė is a Lithuanian feminine given name. The masculine form of Deimantė is Deimantas.
People bearing the name Deimantė include:
Deimantė Cornette (born 1989), Lithuanian chess player
Deimantė Kizalaitė (born 1999), Lithuanian figure skater

References

Lithuanian feminine given names